Elijah Pope "Pete" Tinsley (March 16, 1913 – May 11, 1995) was a professional football  player, born in Sumter, South Carolina, who played guard, defense and offense for eight seasons for the Green Bay Packers.  He was inducted into the Green Bay Packers Hall of Fame in 1979.

References

1913 births
1995 deaths
Sportspeople from Spartanburg, South Carolina
American football offensive tackles
Georgia Bulldogs football players
Green Bay Packers players
Chicago Cardinals players
Players of American football from South Carolina